Benjamin House (born 5 July 1999) is a professional footballer who plays as a striker for Lincoln City.

Born in England, he represented Scotland at youth international level.

Club career

Reading
Born in Guildford, House started his career in the youth team of Aldershot Town before signing for the youth team of Reading in 2016. In July 2017, House signed his first professional contract with Reading. On 15 March 2018, House signed a new contract with Reading until the summer of 2020.

On 4 January 2019, House joined Swindon Town on loan until the end of the 2018–19 season.

On 12 November 2019, House joined Dagenham & Redbridge on loan until 1 January 2020. On 30 January 2020, House returned to Dagenham & Redbridge on loan for the remainder of the season.

On 2 July 2020, Reading announced House had left the club after his contract had expired.

Eastleigh
In August 2020 he signed for Eastleigh. House made his Eastleigh debut on 3 October 2020, an opening day 5–1 victory at Barnet where House also scored his first goal for the club, to make it 3–1 in the 56th minute of the game. On 9 November, House was awarded National League Player of the Month award for October, scoring five league goals in his first month at the club.

Lincoln City
On 24 January 2022, House signed for Lincoln City for an undisclosed fee. He made his debut on 29 January 2022, coming off the bench against Burton Albion. He scored his first goal for the club against Portsmouth on 15 April 2022.

International career
House has represented Scotland at under-20 international youth level. He made his debut for the under-21 team in March 2019.

Career statistics

Honours
Individual
National League Player of the Month: October 2020

References

1999 births
Living people
Scottish footballers
People from Guildford
Reading F.C. players
Swindon Town F.C. players
Dagenham & Redbridge F.C. players
Aldershot Town F.C. players
Eastleigh F.C. players
Lincoln City F.C. players
English Football League players
National League (English football) players
Association football forwards
Scotland youth international footballers
Scotland under-21 international footballers